Nathans Circus, also known as Welch & Nathans' Circus was a series of circuses operated by the Nathans family in the 1850s. His acts included the Colonel Routh Goshen and Marie Macarte.

Circuses
1843 - Welch & Mann
1844 to 1846 - Welch, Mann & Delavan
1847 - Welch & Delavan
1848 to 1850 - Welch, Delavan & Nathans
1851 - Welch & Nathans

References

Circuses